The Wellsboro and Corning Railroad  is a  shortline railroad that operates between Wellsboro, Pennsylvania and Corning, New York, passing through Tioga, and Lawrenceville. It parallels PA Route 287 and U.S. Route 15, following the valleys of Marsh Creek, Crooked Creek, and the Tioga River. The railroad connects with Norfolk Southern's Southern Tier Line at Corning.

The line was formerly part of the New York Central Railroad system, and was bought from Conrail by Growth Resources of Wellsboro in 1992. The WCOR began operations in 1993, and was controlled by Richard Robey, owner of the North Shore Railroad System, until January 2008, when Myles Group of Exton, Pennsylvania bought the company. The Tioga Central Railroad operated tourist trains over the line between Wellsboro and Tioga. In April 2012, RailAmerica purchased a 20% shareholding.

History
Most of the WCOR was once part of a main line from the New York Central's (NYC) Water Level Route at Lyons south to Williamsport. The Tioga Coal, Iron Mining and Manufacturing Company opened the portion from Corning south to the state line at Lawrenceville in 1840, and in 1872 the Wellsboro and Lawrenceville Railroad completed an extension through Wellsboro to Antrim. (The main line, finished in 1883 by the Jersey Shore, Pine Creek & Buffalo Railway, branched off north of Wellsboro.) NYC leased the lines in 1899, and in 1914 absorbed successor Geneva, Corning and Southern Railroad.

Conrail retained the line when it began operations in 1976, but later abandoned it south of Wellsboro Junction, through Pine Creek Gorge (also known as the Grand Canyon of Pennsylvania), turning the line into a minor branch. Growth Resources of Wellsboro bought the line in December 1992, and the WCOR began operating in January 1993. The Tioga Central Railroad, which had operated freight in Tioga County, New York until May 1992 (when the Owego & Harford Railway took over), began operating tourist trains in May 1994.

Marcellus Shale and railroad operations
The railroad's geographic orientation covers one of the largest and most active portions of the Marcellus Shale formation, which is being actively explored for natural gas. This has resulted in customers referring to the railroad as the "Main Line to the Marcellus". Working closely with sister company IWG Logistics, the family-owned and operated companies provide complete railroad, transloading, logistics, and railcar repair services.

The railroad had its busiest year in more than two decades in 2009, fueled by demand from a booming natural gas industry in the region, which uses sand in hydraulic fracturing operations. The sand-hauling portion of the railroad's operations began in 2009, and made up 80% of their business in 2010.

See also

List of Pennsylvania railroads

References

External links
Wellsboro and Corning Railroad official webpage - Genesee and Wyoming website
Myles Group, LLC

Transportation in Tioga County, Pennsylvania
Pennsylvania railroads
New York (state) railroads
Spin-offs of Conrail
Railway companies established in 1993
Transportation in Steuben County, New York
RailAmerica